Weissberg is a surname. Notable people with the name include:

Alexander Weissberg-Cybulski, Polish-Austrian physicist
Eric Weissberg, American musician
Isaac Jacob Weissberg (1841–1904), Hebrew writer
Leib Weissberg, Polish rabbi
Peter Weissberg, British physician
Robert Weissberg, American political scientist
Roger Weissberg, American psychologist
Drossel Weissberg, a fictional character from Atelier Firis: The Alchemist and the Mysterious Journey

See also
Yuliya Veysberg, Russian music critic

Ashkenazi surnames
German toponymic surnames